Charles Herach Papas (March 29, 1918 – July 8, 2007) was an American applied physicist and electrical engineer, known for his contributions to electromagnetic theory, microwaves, radiophysics, gravitational electromagnetics, astrophysics, guided waves, and remote sensing.

His book Theory of Electromagnetic Wave Propagation is a recognized classic on electromagnetic theory.

Background 
Charles Herach Papas was born on March 29, 1918, in Troy, New York. Following his family, which was involved in the import/export trade, he spent his early childhood in Tianjin, China. After returning to the United States and completing high school, he matriculated at the Massachusetts Institute of Technology where he received a B.S. in electrical engineering in 1941. He completed his graduate studies at Harvard University, where he obtained an M.S. in communications engineering in 1946 and a PhD in electrodynamics in 1948, with a dissertation titled A Theoretical Investigation of Spherically-Capped Conical Antennas advised by Ronold W. P. King.

During the war years (1941-1945) he was with the Navy Department, Washington, DC, working at the Naval Ordnance Laboratory on the degaussing problem and at the Bureau of Ships working on microwave radar antennas. After receiving the Ph.D. degree, he remained at Harvard University as a Research Fellow to work with Professor Ronold W. P. King and Professor Léon Brillouin on antenna and scattering problems. From 1950 to 1952 he was with the University of California as a Staff Member of the Los Alamos Scientific Laboratory, as a Consultant to the Radiation Laboratory at the University of California, Berkeley, and as lecturer in the Electrical Engineering Department, Berkeley. At the Radiation Laboratory he assisted Professor Louis Alvarez in the design of a linear accelerator, and at Los Alamos he worked with Professor Enrico Fermi on the theory of radioflash (now known as EMP). In 1952 Papas accepted a faculty position at the California Institute of Technology where he continued his teaching and research activities for 36 years, and was Director of the Antenna Laboratory. After retiring in 1989, he was Emeritus Professor of Electrical Engineering.

As a result of his pioneering work in radiophysics and the electrodynamics of flare stars, Papas was honored with election to the Academy of Sciences in Yerevan, Armenia, and the Academy of Sciences in Bologna Italy.

Books
Theory of Electromagnetic Wave Propagation (McGraw-Hill, 1965; reprinted by Dover Publications, 2011).
Lectures on Electromagnetic Theory (Academy of Sciences, Yerevan, Armenia, 1973).
Electromagnetic Waveguides and Resonators, in Handbuch der Physik, vol. XVI, (Springer-Verlag, 1958).  With Fritz Borgnis
Randwertprobleme der Mikrowellenphysik (Springer-Verlag, 1955).  With Fritz Borgnis

Awards
foreign member of the Academy of Sciences, Bologna, Italy
foreign member of the Academy of Sciences, Yerevan, Armenia

References 

20th-century American engineers
California Institute of Technology faculty
Harvard School of Engineering and Applied Sciences alumni
MIT School of Engineering alumni
1918 births
2007 deaths
Microwave engineers